The Building at 417–419 Lee Street is a historic apartment building in Evanston, Illinois. The two-story four-flat building was built in 1902. Architect Edgar O. Blake, an Evanston architect who had designed houses in the city since the 1870s, designed the building. The building's design includes a Georgian entrance with side columns, sidelights, and a fanlight, limestone banding, a wooden entablature, and a brick parapet. The four apartments are an early example of upper-class apartment design in Evanston; of particular note are its screened porches, which were a precursor to the sunrooms commonly seen in later buildings.

The building was added to the National Register of Historic Places on March 15, 1984.

References

Buildings and structures on the National Register of Historic Places in Cook County, Illinois
Residential buildings on the National Register of Historic Places in Illinois
Buildings and structures in Evanston, Illinois
Apartment buildings in Illinois
Residential buildings completed in 1902